Discrimination based on nationality is discriminating against a person based on their nationality, country of citizenship, or national origin. Although many countries' non-discrimination laws contain exceptions for nationality and immigration status, nationality is related to race and religion, so direct discrimination on the basis of nationality may be indirect discrimination on racial or religious grounds. Discrimination "against any particular nationality" is prohibited by the International Convention on the Elimination of All Forms of Racial Discrimination (CERD).

Treaties
Article 1(1) of the International Convention on the Elimination of All Forms of Racial Discrimination (CERD) defines racial discrimination as a "distinction, exclusion, restriction or preference based on race, colour, descent, or national or ethnic origin which has the purpose or effect of nullifying or impairing the recognition, enjoyment or exercise, on an equal footing, of human rights and fundamental freedoms in the political, economic, social, cultural or any other field of public life". The treaty allows distinguishing between citizens and non-citizens, but not "against any particular nationality", which could encompass a grouping of particular nationalities.

Prohibition of discrimination based on nationality for nationals of European single market member states is a key aspect of the European single market. Article 18 of the Treaty on the Functioning of the European Union (TFEU) bans discrimination based on nationality within the scope of the treaties. According to the European Court of Justice, this prohibition is not applicable to non-nationals of member states of the European Union or European single market. Investment treaties also prohibit discrimination based on the nationality of the investor.

Article 7(1) of the Refugee Convention prohibits discrimination on the basis of nationality among refugees.

Labor market
One study found that foreign NBA players were paid less than United States nationals of equivalent performance between the 1999-2000 and 2007-2008 seasons.

A 2021 study recommended narrowly interpreting exceptions for nationality in non-discrimination laws to ensure that forms of racial discrimination are not being enabled.

Migration law
Many states have travel and immigration laws based on nationality, for example offering visa-free travel to nationals of certain states but not others.

A well-known example of discrimination on the basis of nationality is the Executive Order 13769 ("Muslim ban") in which nationals of several Muslim-majority states were prohibited from traveling to the United States.

According to Professor of Migration Law , "at face value, migration law is also a form of racial discrimination" under the CERD.

Global apartheid is a term used to describe how Global North countries discriminate on the basis of nationality and deny permanent residency or citizenship to migrants from the Global South as well as discrimination based on nationality in migration law.

According to Gareth Davies, eliminating discrimination based on nationality would create polities based on residence rather than citizenship.

See also
 Executive Order 11246 — banning discrimination based on national origin

References

Further reading

Discrimination
Nationality